Messick is an unincorporated community in Blue River Township, Henry County, Indiana.

History
Messick was founded in 1882 when the railroad was extended to that point. A man named Messick owned a general store in town. A post office was established in Messick in 1884, and remained in operation until it was discontinued in 1926.

Geography

References

Unincorporated communities in Henry County, Indiana
Unincorporated communities in Indiana